Stowell Meadow is a 2.8 hectare (6.9 acre) biological Site of Special Scientific Interest near Tatworth in Somerset, notified in 1987.

Stowell Meadow supports a nationally rare type of traditionally managed wet neutral grassland. Alder woodland and plant communities typical of marshy grassland are also present. 90 species of plant have been recorded to date, several of which have a local distribution in Somerset. A number of nationally scarce species of beetle have already
been recorded.

References 

Sites of Special Scientific Interest in Somerset
Sites of Special Scientific Interest notified in 1987
Meadows in Somerset